WMTV (channel 15) is a television station in Madison, Wisconsin, United States, affiliated with NBC and The CW. The station is owned by Gray Television and maintains studios and transmitter facilities on Forward Drive on Madison's southwest side.

WMTV was the second television station to air in Madison, beginning in July 1953 just days after WKOW, and has been its NBC affiliate since signing on the air. Founded by a company controlled by the Bartell Group, it was sold to the Wisconsin Valley Television Company (later Forward Communications Corporation) in 1963. The station was successful and competitive in news ratings under Forward, even if it faced economic disadvantages due to being an ultra high frequency (UHF) station. After a succession of owners in the late 1980s and 1990s, Gray acquired WMTV in 2002.

History

Early years on channel 33
After the Federal Communications Commission lifted its four-year freeze on new television station grants and opened the ultra high frequency (UHF) band for television use, applications were received to start new stations in Madison. The first came from the Bartell Group, owned by Madison radio announcer Gerry Bartell and owner of Milwaukee station WOKY, for channel 33, one of two UHF channels allocated for commercial use in the city. Another application for channel 33 was made by Earl W. Fessler, owner of Madison FM radio outlet WMFM. In late December, Fessler and Bartell combined their applications, becoming the unopposed bid for channel 33 as the Bartell Television Corporation and being granted a construction permit on January 23, 1953. 

WMTV signed on the air with a test pattern on July 8, 1953, and began normal operation 11 days later with a dedication program. This made it the second station on air in Madison, as WKOW-TV (channel 27) began broadcasting on July 8. It was an affiliate of NBC, ABC, and DuMont. The WMTV facility along the Beltline contained a main studio complete with revolving stage, claimed to be the only one east of California, as well as a permanently installed kitchen for cooking shows. ABC programs moved to WKOW-TV in September 1956 when WISC-TV began as a CBS affiliate on channel 3.

In March 1956, it was announced that the Badger Broadcasting Company, owner of radio station WIBA and a joint venture of The Capital Times and Wisconsin State Journal newspapers, could soon own WMTV, with Gerry Bartell staying as the station's general manager. Bartell proposed to sell the newspapers a two-thirds interest in the station. However, the parties were unable to reach final agreement on matters related to the sale, and the proposed transaction was abandoned in August. With WMTV as Bartell's only television property, Wometco Enterprises filed in 1957 to buy WMTV for $350,000.

Move to channel 15; Forward ownership
Wometco owned the station less than a year before Forward Television, a company owned by Lee Enterprises of Mason City, Iowa, acquired WMTV in 1958. During Forward Television's ownership, the station applied to move from channel 33 to channel 15. The move took effect on October 25, 1961, after weather and antenna fabrication delays.

Lee accepted an offer from Wisconsin Valley Television Corporation to acquire WMTV in December 1962. Wisconsin Valley was a consortium of newspaper interests that owned WSAU radio and television in Wausau. The FCC only narrowly approved the transaction on a 4–3 vote in May 1963, in large part because the firm was being investigated for its relationship with efforts to start an educational television station in Wausau on the only other VHF channel in that city so as to prevent it from going into commercial use; a condition was attached that allowed the FCC to order the sale of WMTV to another group at no profit to Wisconsin Valley should it find the firm abused its processes. That September, the FCC voted 5–0 to allow the sale to stand after Midcontinent Broadcasting, owner of WKOW-TV, asked it to reconsider.

The new ownership of the station invested in equipment, including an upgraded transmitter facility which increased the effective radiated power to 950,000 watts in 1965. Wisconsin Valley renamed itself Forward Communications Corporation at the start of 1967 in the wake of acquiring its first broadcast property outside the state of Wisconsin, KVTV in Sioux City, Iowa. Despite an improved product and Forward's ability to pull WMTV out of its status as a "financial loser", the Madison station continued to be something of an uphill struggle for Forward because of the configuration of the market, with WISC-TV as the only very high frequency (VHF) station against two commercial UHF outlets.

Forward was sold in late 1984 to Wesray Capital Corporation, which retained the Forward name for its media holdings. However, the new Forward began a decline in news ratings. Prior to the sale, WMTV competed with WISC for the lead in local news ratings, finding stronger acceptance in Dane County itself. However, the station was hit by cutbacks in the newsroom, as well as in the production of non-news local programming, and declining news ratings. The departures of sports director Jack Eich, who was fired, and Paula Dilworth, who was passed over for a promotion and bolted for Las Vegas, made headlines and put general manager Leslie Leonard in the news.

Since 1988
Wesray sold its TV stations to Adams Communications in 1988, but the deal left Adams highly leveraged and ill-prepared to confront declines in the value of broadcast properties, prompting it to default on $283 million of debt in 1991; that same year, WMTV debuted its first morning newscast, Wisconsin Today. Brissette Broadcasting was formed the next year when Paul Brissette, who had been the vice president of Adams Communications's television stations division, bought out the business for $257 million. Four years later, in a $270 million merger, Brissette was folded into Benedek Broadcasting after the company was unable to expand by adding stations. By that time, WMTV had slumped to third in local news ratings; later in 1996, it adopted the current NBC 15 station brand. The retirement of longtime weatherman Elmer Childress in 1997 also paved the way for the station to take a more aggressive approach to weather coverage, including adding its own Doppler weather radar.

Financial problems developed at Benedek at the start of the new millennium. The early 2000s recession reduced ad sales and caused the company to be unable to pay interest on a set of bonds issued in 1996, prompting a filing for Chapter 11 bankruptcy. Most of the Benedek stations, including WMTV, were sold to Gray Television in 2002. The station discontinued analog broadcasting on February 17, 2009.

In 2016, Gray built new studios for WMTV adjacent to the original facility, with twice the square footage; the old studios were demolished for parking. That same year, a new affiliation agreement between The CW and Gray resulted in the network affiliation in Madison moving to a subchannel of WMTV from WBUW.

Subchannels
The station's digital signal is multiplexed:

Notes

References

External links
Official website

MTV
NBC network affiliates
The CW affiliates
Antenna TV affiliates
MeTV affiliates
Start TV affiliates
WeatherNation TV affiliates
Gray Television
Television channels and stations established in 1953
1953 establishments in Wisconsin